The Monkey King: Quest for the Sutra is a 2002 Hong Kong TV series  based on the 16th-century novel Journey to the West. It is also a remake of the 1996 TVB version.

This is the second Monkey King that is portrayed by Dicky Cheung, the other one being Journey to the West (1996). It is also the first Monkey King series that is not titled Journey to the West. It was only broadcast on TVB, even though it is a Hong Kong-Taiwanese co-production.

This series consists of 40 episodes.

Cast 
Leading stars

Dicky Cheung as Sun Wukong
Edmond Leung as Tang Sanzang
Eric Kot as Zhu Bajie
Sam Lee as Sha Wujing
Andy Hui as White Dragon Horse

Other stars
Charlene Choi as Purple Orchid
Gillian Chung as Purple Rose
Sammi Cheng as Guan Yin
Nicholas Tse as Chung Kwai
William So as East Sea Dragon Emperor
Fennie Yuen as The Snake Evil

Kristy Yang as White Bone Demon
Ai Iijima as Black Spider Demon
Bryan Leung as Lee Ching
Jimmy Lin as Ne Zha
Alien Sun as White Spider Demon
Yuki Hsu as Red Boy
Anita Yuen as The Goddess of Nine Heaven
Law Kar-ying as Golden Star
Barbie Shu as Ice Goddess
Xiao Qiang as Steel Fan Princess
Cheung Sai as SuSu
Lee San-San as Seven Treasure Umbrella 七寶羅傘

TVB dramas
Television shows based on Journey to the West
2002 Hong Kong television series debuts
2002 Hong Kong television series endings